Mary Teresa Enright  (22 July 1880 – 21 January 1966) was a New Zealand teacher, journalist and community worker. She was born in Charleston, West Coast, New Zealand, on 22 July 1880.

In the 1948 King's Birthday Honours, Enright was appointed a Member of the Order of the British Empire for social welfare work among women and children. In 1953, she was awarded the Queen Elizabeth II Coronation Medal.

References

1880 births
1966 deaths
New Zealand educators
New Zealand social workers
People from the West Coast, New Zealand
People educated at Nelson College for Girls
Place of death missing
New Zealand Members of the Order of the British Empire
20th-century New Zealand journalists